Michelle LaCourse is a viola player and string department chair on the faculty of the Boston University College of Fine Arts.

Education
LaCourse began her musical studies in the Traverse City (Michigan) School System. She has studied with David Holland at the Interlochen Arts Academy, Robert Swan at Northwestern University, and Karen Tuttle at the Peabody Conservatory of Music. During her time at Peabody, she won the first Peabody Concours, a recital competition open to all Peabody students. LaCourse served as a longtime teaching assistant to Karen Tuttle and currently serves as a faculty member of the annual Karen Tuttle "Coordination" Workshop.

Performances
As a soloist and chamber musician, LaCourse has performed throughout the United States and Europe and in South America, including recent performances in Italy, Spain, and Brazil. LaCourse was formerly a member of the Lehigh Quartet, the Delphic String Trio and the Aeolian Trio.  As an orchestral musician, she has performed with the Baltimore Symphony, and was formerly principal violist of the Chamber Orchestra of Grenoble France and of the Concerto Soloists Chamber Orchestra of Philadelphia.  LaCourse has commissioned a body of work for both solo viola as well as viola and piano from composer James Grant.  Her recording of these works, "Chocolates: Music for Viola and Piano by James Grant" was released by MSR Classics (MS1335).  Ms. LaCourse often performs with composer and pianist Martin Amlin, who is also on faculty at Boston University; this collaboration is featured on this recording.
She performs on a viola made for her in 2000 by Steven Keller of Keller and Son in Philadelphia.

References

External links
Boston University College of Fine Arts
Vianden International Music Festival & School Faculty-Michelle LaCourse

Living people
American classical violists
Women violists
American music educators
American women music educators
Viola pedagogues
Year of birth missing (living people)
21st-century American women